Jack Dunlop (born April 23, 1994), better known as CouRageJD or CouRage, is an American YouTuber and streamer. He streams his gaming experiences live on YouTube. He is also a content creator for and co-owner of 100 Thieves, a lifestyle brand and esports organization.

Early life 
Dunlop was born in New Jersey, where he grew up with his sister. He graduated from Towson University with a degree in Electronic Media and Film.

Career 
Dunlop created his Twitch account in 2013, but didn't start streaming until 2018.

Dunlop began his career playing Halo and eventually won an internship at MLG through various contacts and friends that he had made through the game. During his career at MLG, he was chosen to host the daily MLG live show as a replacement for his colleague Chris Puckett, who was unwell. According to the league, Dunlop "did such a good job" that he was later permitted by the league to co-host for the next six weeks. From 2014 through 2018, Dunlop hosted and cast many major Call of Duty esports events including the Call of Duty World League Championship in 2016, 2017, and 2018, MLG tournaments Pro League in 2014, 2015, and 2016, and UMG tournaments in 2015 and 2016.

On March 2, 2018, he announced his transition from MLG to the Call of Duty franchise. On March 12, he signed with OpTic Gaming as a content creator. In November, he left OpTic to pursue a solo career.

On April 20, 2019, it was confirmed that Dunlop would be both casting and playing in the Fortnite World Cup. On June 16, Dunlop took part in the Fortnite Pro-Am 2019, partnering with celebrity Brendon Urie.

On May 28, 2019, Dunlop was announced as a content creator for and official member of esports organization 100 Thieves. Although the secret was leaked a few days before the announcement by Ninja, his signing had been suspected by his fanbase, as he was already living in the team's content house with friends and fellow streamers Matthew "Nadeshot" Haag and Rachell "Valkyrae" Hofstetter.

After developing an online friendship with artist Ariana Grande, Dunlop went on to make a parody of Ariana Grande's song "Boyfriend", to which she replied, "You're perfect." Dunlop and his girlfriend were also featured in Grande and Justin Bieber's music video "Stuck with U".

On November 4, 2019, Dunlop announced his switch from streaming on Twitch to streaming on YouTube through a comedic skit featuring other 100 Thieves house members. He cited reasons like stability and "the fear of being tied down just for a sub count button", along with other factors like conveying a wider range of content, as the main reasons for his departure from the platform. On April 23, 2020, during a twelve-hour charity birthday stream with the purpose of raising money for coronavirus relief, Dunlop received a total of $250,000 in donations within the first four hours of the stream and ended the stream with approximately $503,254 donated to the CDC.

On April 7, 2021, Dunlop was announced as a co-owner of 100 Thieves alongside Hofstetter. They join Scooter Braun, Dan Gilbert, Drake, and Haag. As co-owners, Hofstetter and Dunlop will receive equity in the company, which Forbes magazine recently valued at $190 million.

On June 9, 2022, Dunlop appeared in the Fall Guys segment of Mediatonic's Summer Games Fest 2022 trailers as himself.

Filmography

TV series

Music videos

References 

1994 births
Living people
American people of Italian descent
20th-century American people
21st-century American people
American YouTubers
YouTube channels launched in 2013
YouTube streamers